Bavarian B IVs were early German steam locomotives with the Royal Bavarian State Railways (Königlich Bayerische Staatsbahn).

The six engines built by Kessler were trialled with a Kessler boiler. This had a pear-shaped cross section and could therefore be set lower down between the wheels. The same effect was also attempted on the machines from Hartmann by using two boilers: a lower boiler with a small diameter and a larger, upper boiler. After two boiler explosions occurred, all the engines were equipped with normal boilers. All the vehicles had a steam dome in the centre, and the overhanging outer firebox had a flat top on which there was a safety valve and a pump (Fahrpumpe) driven by the crossheads.

They had Bavarian 3 T 5 tenders.

See also 
 List of Bavarian locomotives and railbuses

External links 
 Railways of Germany forum

2-4-0 locomotives
B 04
Sächsische Maschinenfabrik locomotives
Esslingen locomotives
Standard gauge locomotives of Germany
Railway locomotives introduced in 1852
1B n2 locomotives
Passenger locomotives